This is a list of military corps arranged by ordinal number.

I to X
 I Corps
 I Army Corps (Argentina)
 I ANZAC Corps (Australia and New Zealand)
 I Corps (Australia)
 I Corps (Belgium)
 1st Corps of the Army of the Republic of Bosnia and Herzegovina
 I Canadian Corps
 I Corps (Czechoslovakia)
 Finnish I Corps (Winter War)
 1st Army Corps (France)
 I Cavalry Corps (Grande Armée), a cavalry formation of the Imperial French army during the Napoleonic Wars
 I Corps (Grande Armée), a corps of the Imperial French army during the Napoleonic Wars
 I Cavalry Corps (German Empire), a unit of the Imperial German Army during World War I
 I Corps (German Empire), a unit of the Imperial German Army prior to and during World War I
 I Reserve Corps (German Empire), a unit of the Imperial German Army during World War I
 I Royal Bavarian Corps, a unit of the Bavarian and Imperial German Armies prior to and during World War I
 I Royal Bavarian Reserve Corps, a unit of the Bavarian and Imperial German Armies during World War I
 I Army Corps (Wehrmacht)
 I SS Panzer Corps
 I Army Corps (Greece)
 I Corps (British India)
 I Corps (India)
 I Corps (North Korea)
 I Corps (Ottoman Empire)
 I Corps (Pakistan)
 Polish I Corps (disambiguation)
 1st Territorial Army Corps (Romania)
 I Russian Corps. 
 Soviet 1st Guards Mechanized Corps
 I Corps (South Korea)
 I Corps (South Vietnam)
 I Corps (United Kingdom)
 I Airborne Corps (United Kingdom)
 I Corps (United States)
 I Amphibious Corps (United States)
 I Armored Corps (United States)
 I Corps (Union Army)
 First Corps, Army of Northern Virginia
 First Corps, Army of Tennessee
 First Army Corps (Spanish–American War)
 I Field Force, Vietnam (United States)
 1st Corps (Vietnam People's Army)

 II Corps
 II Anzac Corps (Australia and New Zealand)
 II Army Corps (Argentina)
 II Corps (Australia)
 II Canadian Corps
 Second Artillery Corps (China)
 Finnish II Corps (Winter War)
 2nd Army Corps (France)
 II Cavalry Corps (Grande Armée), a cavalry formation of the Imperial French army during the Napoleonic Wars
 II Corps (Grande Armée), a corps of the Imperial French army during the Napoleonic Wars
 II Cavalry Corps (German Empire), a unit of the Imperial German Army during World War I
 II Corps (German Empire), a unit of the Imperial German Army prior to and during World War I
 II Royal Bavarian Corps, a unit of the Bavarian and Imperial German Armies prior to and during World War I
 II Royal Bavarian Reserve Corps, a unit of the Bavarian and Imperial German Armies during World War I
 II SS Panzer Corps
 II Corps (Greece)
 II Corps (India)
 II Corps (North Korea)
 II Corps (Ottoman Empire)
 II Corps (Pakistan)
 II Corps (Poland)
 2nd Rifle Corps
 2nd Guards Tank Corps
 II Corps (South Korea)
 II Corps (South Vietnam)
 II Corps (United Kingdom)
 II Corps (United States), World War II
 II Corps (ACW), American Civil War 
 Second Corps, Army of Northern Virginia
 Second Army Corps (Spanish–American War) a US Army formation active for several months of 1898
 2nd Corps (Vietnam People's Army)

 III Corps
 III Army Corps (Argentina)
 III Corps (Australia)
 3rd Corps (Bosnia)
 Finnish III Corps (Winter War)
 Finnish III Corps (Continuation War)
 3rd Army Corps (France)
 III Cavalry Corps (Grande Armée), a cavalry formation of the Imperial French army during the Napoleonic Wars
 III Corps (Grande Armée), a corps of the Imperial French army during the Napoleonic Wars
 III Cavalry Corps (German Empire), a unit of the Imperial German Army during World War I
 III Corps (German Empire), a unit of the Imperial German Army prior to and during World War I
 III Reserve Corps (German Empire), a unit of the Imperial German Army during World War I
 III Royal Bavarian Corps, a unit of the Bavarian and Imperial German Armies prior to and during World War I
 III Army Corps (Wehrmacht) (World War II)
 III Panzer Corps (Germany)
 III (Germanic) SS Panzer Corps
 III Army Corps (Greece)
 III Corps (India)
 Iraqi III Corps
 III Corps (Ottoman Empire)
 III Army Corps (Russian Empire) (World War I)
 3rd Breakthrough Artillery Corps (Soviet Union)
 3rd Guards Rifle Corps (Soviet Union)
 3rd Mechanized Corps (Soviet Union)
 3rd Rifle Corps (Soviet Union)
 III Corps (South Korea)
 III Corps (South Vietnam)
 III Corps (Turkey)
 III Corps (United Kingdom)
 III Corps (United States)
 III Corps (Union Army)
 Third Army Corps (Spanish–American War)
 3rd Corps (Vietnam People's Army)

 IV Corps
 IV Army Corps (Argentina)
 4th Army Corps (France)
 IV Cavalry Corps (Grande Armée), a cavalry formation of the Imperial French army during the Napoleonic Wars
 IV Corps (Grande Armée), a corps of the Imperial French army during the Napoleonic Wars
 IV Cavalry Corps (German Empire), a unit of the Imperial German Army during World War I
 IV Corps (German Empire), a unit of the Imperial German Army prior to and during World War I
 IV Reserve Corps (German Empire), a unit of the Imperial German Army during World War I
 IV Army Corps (Wehrmacht), a unit of the German Army in World War II
 IV Army Corps (Greece)
 IV Corps (India)
 IV Corps (Ottoman Empire)
 IV Corps (Pakistan)
 4th Territorial Army Corps (Romania)
 IV Corps (South Vietnam)
 4th Mechanized Corps (Soviet Union)
 IV Corps (United Kingdom)
 IV Corps (United States)
 IV Corps (Union Army)
 Fourth Corps, Army of Northern Virginia
 Fourth Army Corps (Spanish–American War)
 4th Corps (Vietnam People's Army)

 V Corps
 V Army Corps (Argentina)
 V Corps (Bosnia and Herzegovina)
 5th Army Corps (France)
 V Cavalry Corps (Grande Armée), a cavalry formation of the Imperial French army during the Napoleonic Wars
 V Corps (Grande Armée), a corps of the Imperial French army during the Napoleonic Wars
 V Cavalry Corps (German Empire), a unit of the Imperial German Army during World War I
 V Corps (German Empire), a unit of the Imperial German Army prior to and during World War I
 V Reserve Corps (German Empire), a unit of the Imperial German Army during World War I
 V SS Mountain Corps, a unit of the Waffen SS during World War II
 V Army Corps (Wehrmacht), a unit of the Wehrmacht during World War II
 V Army Corps (Greece)
 V Corps (North Korea)
 V Corps (Ottoman Empire)
 V Corps (Pakistan)
 5th Corps (Syria)
 V Corps (United Kingdom)
 V Corps (United States)
 V Amphibious Corps (United States)
 V Corps Artillery (United States)
 V Corps (Union Army), an American Civil War formation
 Fifth Army Corps (Spanish–American War), a unit of the U.S. Army organized in 1898 and disbanded in the same year

 VI Corps
 VI Cavalry Corps (Grande Armée), a cavalry formation of the Imperial French army during the Napoleonic Wars
 VI Corps (Grande Armée), a formation of the Imperial French army during the Napoleonic Wars
 VI Cavalry Corps (German Empire), a unit of the Imperial German Army during World War I
 VI Corps (German Empire), a unit of the Imperial German Army prior to and during World War I
 VI Reserve Corps (German Empire), a unit of the Imperial German Army during World War I
 VI Corps (Germany) World War II
 VI Corps (Ottoman Empire)
 VI Russian Corps
 VI Corps (United Kingdom) a formation of the British Army during World War I 
 VI Corps (United States)
 VI Corps (Union Army), a formation of the Union (North) during the American Civil War
 Sixth Army Corps (Spanish-American War)

 VII Corps
 VII Corps (Grande Armée), a corps of the Imperial French army during the Napoleonic Wars
 VII Corps (German Empire), a unit of the Imperial German Army prior to and during World War I
 VII Reserve Corps (German Empire), a unit of the Imperial German Army during World War I
 VII Corps (Ottoman Empire)
 VII Corps (United Kingdom)
 VII Corps (United States)
 VII Corps (Union Army), two separate formations of the Union Army (North) during the American Civil War
 Seventh Army Corps (Spanish–American War)

 VIII Corps
 VIII Corps (Grande Armée), a corps of the Imperial French army during the Napoleonic Wars
 VIII Corps (German Empire), a formation of the Imperial German Army prior to and during World War I
 VIII Reserve Corps (German Empire), a formation of the Imperial German Army during World War I
 VIII Corps (Ottoman Empire)
 8th Cavalry Corps (Soviet Union)
 8th Estonian Rifle Corps of the Red Army
 8th Army Corps (Ukraine)
 VIII Corps (United Kingdom)
 VIII Corps (United States), a formation of the U.S. Army in World War I and World War II
 VIII Corps (Union Army), a formation of the American Civil War
 Eighth Army Corps (Spanish–American War), a U.S. Army formation of the Spanish–American and Philippine–American wars

 IX Corps
 9th Army Corps (France)
 IX Corps (Grande Armée), a corps of the Imperial French army during the Napoleonic Wars
 IX Corps (German Empire), a unit of the Imperial German Army prior to and during World War I
 IX Reserve Corps (German Empire), a unit of the Imperial German Army during World War I
 IX Army Corps (Wehrmacht) of World War II
 IX Waffen Mountain Corps of the SS (Croatian)
 IX Corps (Ottoman Empire)
 IX Corps (United Kingdom)
 IX Corps (United States)
 IX Corps (Union Army)

 X Corps
 10th Army Corps (France)
 X Corps (Grande Armée), a corps of the Imperial French army during the Napoleonic Wars
 X Corps (German Empire), a unit of the Imperial German Army prior to and during World War I
 X Reserve Corps (German Empire), a unit of the Imperial German Army during World War I
 X SS Corps
 X Corps (Ottoman Empire)
 X Corps (Pakistan)
 X Corps (United Kingdom)
 X Corps (United States)
 X Corps (Union Army)

XI to XX 
 XI Corps
 11th Army Corps (France)
 XI Corps (Grande Armée), a corps of the Imperial French army during the Napoleonic Wars
 XI Corps (German Empire), a unit of the Imperial German Army prior to and during World War I
 XI Corps (Ottoman Empire)
 XI Corps (Pakistan), a formation of the Pakistani Army
 11th Army Corps (Russian Empire)
 XI Corps (United Kingdom), a formation of the British Army during the 1st and 2nd World Wars
 XI Corps (United States), a corps of the United States Army in World War II and the Korean War
 XI Corps (ACW), a formation of the Union (Northern) Army during the American Civil War 
 XI Corps (Union Army), a corps of the United States Army in the American Civil War

 XII Corps
 12th Army Corps (France)
 XII Corps (Grande Armée), a corps of the Imperial French army during the Napoleonic Wars
 XII (1st Royal Saxon) Corps, a unit of the Imperial German Army prior to and during World War I
 XII (Royal Saxon) Reserve Corps, a unit of the Imperial German Army during World War I
 XII Corps (India)
 XII Corps (Pakistan)
 XII Corps (Ottoman Empire)
 XII Corps (United Kingdom) (World Wars I and II)
 XII Corps (United States) (World War II)
 XII Corps (ACW) (American Civil War)
 XII Corps (Union Army)

 XIII Corps
 XIII Corps (Grande Armée), a corps of the Imperial French army during the Napoleonic Wars
 XIII (Royal Württemberg) Corps, a unit of the Imperial German Army prior to and during World War I
 XIII Corps (Ottoman Empire)
 XIII Russian Corps
 XIII Corps (United Kingdom), a British infantry corps during the First World War, and a British-commanded Commonwealth formation during the Second World War
 XIII Corps (United States)
 XIII Corps (Union Army), America Civil War Corps

 XIV Corps
 XIV Corps (Grande Armée), a corps of the Imperial French army during the Napoleonic Wars
 XIV Corps (German Empire), a unit of the Imperial German Army prior to and during World War I
 XIV Reserve Corps (German Empire), a unit of the Imperial German Army during World War I
 XIV Corps (India)
 XIV Corps (Ottoman Empire)
 XIV Corps (United Kingdom)
 XIV Corps (United States)
 XIV Corps (ACW), American Civil War Corps

 XV Corps

XV Corps (British India)
XV Corps (German Empire), a unit of the Imperial German Army prior to and during World War I
15th Army Corps (Russian Empire), World War I 
XV Royal Bavarian Reserve Corps, a unit of the Bavarian and Imperial German Armies during World War I
XV Army Corps (Wehrmacht)
XV Mountain Corps (Wehrmacht)
Indian XV Corps
Ottoman XV Corps, World War I
XV Corps (United States), World War II
XV Corps (Union Army), American Civil War
XV Corps (United Kingdom), World War I
15th Rifle Corps, USSR, World War II
XV SS Cossack Cavalry Corps, Germany, World War II

 XVI Corps
 16th Army Corps (France)
 XVI Corps (German Empire), a unit of the Imperial German Army prior to and during World War I
 XVI Corps (Germany)
 XVI Corps (India)
 XVI Corps (United Kingdom), a British field corps during World War I
 XVI Corps (Union Army), a corps of the Union Army during the American Civil War

 XVII Corps
 XVII Corps (German Empire), a unit of the Imperial German Army prior to and during World War I
 XVII Reserve Corps (German Empire), a unit of the Imperial German Army during World War I
 XVII Corps (Union Army)
 XVII Corps (United Kingdom)

 XVIII Corps
 18th Army Corps (France)
 XVIII Corps (German Empire), a unit of the Imperial German Army prior to and during World War I
 XVIII Reserve Corps (German Empire), a unit of the Imperial German Army during World War I
 XVIII Corps (Germany)
 XVIII Corps (United Kingdom)
 XVIII Airborne Corps (United States)
 XVIII Corps (Union Army), a unit of the Union (Northern) Army during the American Civil War

 XIX Corps
 19th Army Corps (France)
 XIX (2nd Royal Saxon) Corps, a unit of the Imperial German Army prior to and during World War I
 XIX Corps (United States)
 XIX Corps (Union Army)
 XIX Corps (United Kingdom)

 XX Corps
 XX Corps (German Empire), a unit of the Imperial German Army prior to and during World War I
 XX Corps (United Kingdom)
 XX Corps (United States)
 XX Corps (Union Army) – a United States Army Corps during the American Civil War
 20th Army Corps (Russian Empire)

XXI-XXX 
 XXI Corps
 XXI Corps (German Empire), a unit of the Imperial German Army prior to and during World War I
 XXI Corps (Ottoman Empire), active during World War I
 XXI Corps (United Kingdom), active during World War I
 Indian XXI Corps, active during World War II
 XXI Corps (India), currently active Indian Army corps
 XXI Corps (United States), active during World War II
 XXI Corps (Union Army), active during the American Civil War

 XXII Corps
 XXII Reserve Corps (German Empire), a unit of the Imperial German Army during World War I
 XXII Corps (Ottoman Empire), World War I
 XXII Corps (ACW), United States Civil War unit
 XXII Corps (United States)
 XXII Corps (United Kingdom)

 XXIII Corps
 XXIII Corps (ACW)
 XXIII Reserve Corps (German Empire), a unit of the Imperial German Army during World War I
 XXIII Corps (United States)
 XXIII Corps (United Kingdom)
 XXIII Russian Corps

 XXIV Corps
 XXIV Reserve Corps (German Empire), a unit of the Imperial German Army during World War I
 XXIV Corps (ACW)
 XXIV Corps (United States)

 XXV Corps
 XXV Reserve Corps (German Empire), a unit of the Imperial German Army during World War I
 XXV Corps (Ottoman Empire), a corps of the Ottoman Army
 XXV Corps (Union Army), a corps of the Union Army during the American Civil War
 XXV Indian Corps, an army corps of the Indian Army during World War II

 XXVI Corps
 XXVI Reserve Corps (German Empire), a unit of the Imperial German Army during World War I

 XXVII Corps
 XXVII Reserve Corps (German Empire), a unit of the Imperial German Army during World War I
 XXVII Army Corps (Wehrmacht), a unit of the German Army during World War II

 XXVIII Corps
 XXVIII Army Corps (Wehrmacht), a unit of the German Army during World War II

 XXIX Corps
 29th Corps (People's Republic of China)
XXIX Army Corps (Wehrmacht)
 29th Army Corps (Russian Empire)
 29th Army Corps (Soviet Union)
 29th Rifle Corps (Soviet Union)
 29th Tank Corps, Soviet Union
 XXX Corps
 XXX Corps (United Kingdom)
 XXX Corps (Wehrmacht)
 XXX Corps (Pakistan)

XXXI and above 
 XXXI Corps
 XXXI Corps (Pakistan)
 XXXI Army Corps (Wehrmacht)
 XXXI Army Corps (Italy)

 XXXII Corps
 XXXII Army Corps (Wehrmacht)

 XXXIII Corps
 Indian XXXIII Corps (WWII) 
 Indian XXXIII Corps
 United States XXXIII Corps
 33rd Army Corps (Russian Empire)
 XXXIII Army Corps (Wehrmacht)

 XXXIV Corps
 Indian XXXIV Corps
 XXXIV Army Corps (Wehrmacht)

 XXXV Corps
 35th Army Corps (France)
 United States XXXV Airborne Corps, a diversionary 'phantom' unit of the United States Army
 35th Army Corps (Russian Empire)
 XXXV Army Corps (Wehrmacht), a German unit during World War II, part of Army Group Centre

 XXXVI Corps
 36th Army Corps (France)
 German XXXVI Corps
 XXXVI Mountain Corps (Wehrmacht), Germany
 36th Army Corps (Russian Empire)
 XXXVI Corps (United States)

 XXXVII Corps
 XXXVII Corps (United States)
 37th Guards Airborne Corps, Soviet Union
 
 XXXVIII Corps
 XXXVIII Reserve Corps (German Empire)
 XXXVIII Army Corps (Wehrmacht)

 XXXIX Corps
 XXXIX Reserve Corps (German Empire)
 XXXIX Corps (Wehrmacht)
 XXXIX Mountain Corps (Wehrmacht)

 XL Corps
 XXXX Reserve Corps (German Empire)
 XXXX Panzer Corps, a tank corps in the German Army during World War II

 XLI Corps
 41st Army Corps (France)
 XXXXI Reserve Corps (German Empire)
 41st Army Corps (Russian Empire)
 XLI Tank Corps (Wehrmacht)

 and higher numbered
 42nd Rifle Corps
 XXXXIII Army Corps (Wehrmacht)
 43rd Army Corps (Soviet Union)
 43rd Army Corps (Soviet Union)
 XXXXIV Army Corps (Wehrmacht)
 XXXXVI Tank Corps (Wehrmacht)
 XXXXVII Tank Corps (Wehrmacht)
 XXXXVIII Tank Corps (Wehrmacht)
 XXXXIX Mountain Corps (Wehrmacht)
 LI Mountain Corps (Wehrmacht)
 51st Corps (German Empire)
 52nd Corps (German Empire)
 53rd Corps (German Empire)
 54th Corps (German Empire)
 55th Corps (German Empire)
 56th Corps (German Empire)
 LVI Tank Corps (Wehrmacht)
 57th Corps (German Empire)
 LVII Tank Corps (Wehrmacht)
 58th Corps (German Empire)
 LVIII Tank Corps (Wehrmacht)
 59th Corps (German Empire)
 60th Corps (German Empire)
 61st Corps (German Empire)
 62nd Corps (German Empire)
 63rd Corps (German Empire)
 64th Corps (German Empire)
 65th Corps (German Empire)
 66th Corps (German Empire)
 LXVI Army Corps (Wehrmacht)
 67th Corps (German Empire)
 LXVII Army Corps (Wehrmacht)
 68th Corps (German Empire)
 LXVIII Army Corps (Wehrmacht)
 LXIX Army Corps (Wehrmacht)
 LXX Army Corps (Wehrmacht)
 LXXI Army Corps (Wehrmacht)
 LXXII Army Corps (Wehrmacht)
 LXXIII Army Corps (Wehrmacht)
 LXXIV Army Corps (Wehrmacht)
 LXXV Army Corps (Wehrmacht)
 LXXVI Tank Corps (Wehrmacht)
 LXXVIII Army Corps (Wehrmacht)
 LXXX Army Corps (Wehrmacht)
 LXXXI Army Corps (Wehrmacht)
 LXXXII Army Corps (Wehrmacht)
 LXXXIII Army Corps (Wehrmacht)
 LXXXIV Army Corps (Wehrmacht)
 LXXXV Army Corps (Wehrmacht)
 LXXXVI Army Corps (Wehrmacht)
 LXXXVII Army Corps (Wehrmacht)
 LXXXVIII Army Corps (Wehrmacht)
 LXXXIX Army Corps (Wehrmacht)
 LXXXX Army Corps (Wehrmacht)
 LXXXXI Army Corps (Wehrmacht)
 LXXXXVII Army Corps (Wehrmacht)
 CI Army Corps (Wehrmacht)

See also
 List of military corps by name
 List of military corps

Military corps by number